Lost Gravity are a rock band formed in 2007 by Breno Val in London, England. The band are known for their powerful guitar riffs, great vocal melodies and groovy drums. Their main influences are AC/DC, Alice in Chains and Metallica.

History

Beginning 
The seed of what became Lost Gravity was sown two years earlier, in 2005, when Breno relocated to Hamburg for a few months to write some songs. Some of these songs became the core of Lost Gravity current setlist like Anywhere But Home and No Way Out. Other songs which were written later, Selfish and Venom in a Vial, were inspired by his time in Germany.

In 2006, back in Brazil, Breno joined a Bruce Dickinson tribute band which toured all over the State of Sao Paulo. Motivated by that tour, in 2007 Lost Gravity was born in London.

Full band 
The first line-up had Chris Finnerty on the drums, an amazing drummer who once auditioned for a project of Irish songs that Breno was involved. Chris never joined that project and months later randomly bumped into Breno on the London Underground, who told him about the idea of forming Lost Gravity and showed him the songs. Chris liked them and was in for the ride. Al Davies (vocals) and Jon Campbell (bass) completed the first Lost Gravity line-up.

At a time when most bands in London were playing indie music, Lost Gravity was bringing grunge music back to the local scene.

In its first year of existence, Lost Gravity played a few shows in the London area and went through many line-up changes.

Recordings 
In January 2008, Lost Gravity recorded their first EP, Anywhere But Home, featuring four tracks: Anywhere But Home, See It Through My Eyes, Venom in A Vial and No Way Out. The line-up at the time was Breno Val (guitar), Mariek Knowles (vocals), Jon Campbell (bass) and Chris Finnerty (drums).

When they toured to promote the EP, Bull and Gate promoters described them as "the power and energy of Alice in Chains, Megadeth and Soundgarden". The title track, Anywhere But Home, was played all over the world in many online radio stations. Radio Basile from Florida described them as "outstanding alternative rock stuff! Wonderful songs, great energy, very talented indeed! Absolutely spectacular".

During 2008 the band played extensively all over London in known venues like The Bull and Gate, The Arts Theatre Club and Fiddlers Elbow. The following year, 2009, Lost Gravity had an almost complete line-up change, only founding member Breno Val remaining. Singer Heath Billin and bassist Steve Reddihough (former member of The Machines, currently with Treason) joined the band after replying to an online ad posted by Breno. The band, stronger than ever, played once again all over London and for the first time outside the city in places like Reading, Guildford and Milton Keynes. Promoter Andozka from Milton Keynes described them as "They put their all into everything! They were bloody AWESOME!".

At the end of 2009 the band recorded their second EP, Selfish, featuring Breno Val on guitars and bass, Heath Billin on vocals and Cesar Dellore on the drums (Breno's long time friend from Sao Paulo). The front cover of the EP has a famous painting by German artist Otto Dix, Mädchen vor dem Spiegel, painted in 1921, which was destroyed during World War II bombings.

The EP was released in two different formats: digital download and physical cd. The online version included four tracks: Selfish, Friendly Fire, All The Same and Heal. The physical CD came with a bonus track, No Way Out, previously released on Anywhere But Home EP.

Australian website Evolution Guitar video reviewed the EP in February 2010. Mic Buvac said "give these guys a good listen because they’ve got quite a sensibility and feeling to their sounds, but they are very very gutty, balls-to-the-wall rock."

In 2010 bassist Richard Waldie and drummer Victor Stoyanov joined the band. That year the band once again played many gigs all over London to promote their second EP. For their first time they played in high-profile venues like The Water Rats and The 12 Bar in London. In March 2010, Breno Val was the special guest of Total Rock's radio show Anarchy on the Airwaves, presented by Mad Maz.

Power trio 
After the departure of Heath, in 2011 Breno took over the vocals, bassist Sherlock Michaels (former member of Storm The Gates) and Colombian drummer Phil Ochoa joined the band. On 3 March 2011, for the first time Lost Gravity performs as a trio in an awesome show at The White Lion (Streatham-UK). Glenn Milligan from Metallville webzine describes the band as "a London based trio that seem to match up metal and commercialism all at once. They are damn good at this style".

Lost Gravity played many gigs in and around London throughout 2011. One of the most important was on 2 May 2011 to raise funds for the victims of the Japanese tsunami. On that occasion Breno dressed up with a Japanese robe while Sherlock wore a Japanese schoolgirl outfit, all in the name of charity. Andy White, singer from Bleed to This joined them on stage for an encore and together they played Metallica's Enter Sandman.

During 2011 the band also made all their music available for free download or pay as you like to adapt their model to the mp3 age where most fans choose to download the music rather than buy the albums.

Their third EP simply named Lost Gravity III was released via Priston Records in June 2012 featuring 3 brand new songs and one acoustic version of Selfish that it was recorded live.

In Autumn 2012 bassist Iggy Nulli and drummer Giuliano Kolling joined the band. The first gig with the new line-up took place at The White Lion, Streatham (London) on 9 November 2012.

During the year of 2013 the band played gigs all over London and for the first time ever the band managed to have a stable line-up for over 12 months.

On 7 January 2014, through their Facebook page, the band announced the departure of bassist Iggy Nulli. No reasons were given.

After Iggy's departure the band entered the studio and recorded their first full-length album self-titled Lost Gravity. It was recorded in 12 days at Freefall Studios London. Breno recorded guitars, bass and vocals. Giuliano recorded the drums and backing vocals. The album was released on 13 October 2014.

Power duo 
After the departure of bassist Connor Meighan, the band became a power duo with Breno on guitar/vocals and Giuliano on the drums. For the live shows they've started using the bass on a backing track.

In September 2017, the band enters the studio to record their second album. How to Make a Giant, featuring 8 new tracks is released on 12 March 2018.

In october 2019 Giuliano Kolling leaves the band after playing his last show with Lost Gravity at the famous St. Moritz Club in Soho, London.

In April 2020 the band introduces their new drummer Giles Kitchingham through their social media pages. Giles is also known for his work with English band Spit Like This. Coincidentally, Lost Gravity and Spit Like This shared the same stage back in 2008 at The Bull and Gate in Kentish Town, London.

Discography 
EPs
 Anywhere But Home (2008)
 Selfish (2009)
 Lost Gravity III (2012)

Full-length album
 Lost Gravity (2014)
 How to Make a Giant (2018)

References 
Lost Gravity – Breno Val on Total Rock Radio
Lost Gravity – Japan tsunami relief gig
Lost Gravity – Selfish EP video review
Lost Gravity – Metallville Selfish EP article
Lost Gravity – Otto Dix Selfish EP cover

External links 

Lost Gravity on Bandcamp

English rock music groups
Musical groups from London